Modest is an unincorporated community in Clermont County, Ohio, United States.

Modest is located on Ohio State Route 727, next to Stonelick Creek.

References

Unincorporated communities in Clermont County, Ohio
Unincorporated communities in Ohio